Desző Berecki (born 19 February 1982) is a Hungarian para table tennis player who competes in international level events. He is a four-time European medalist and has participated at the Paralympic Games five times, his highest achievement was reaching the men's singles' quarterfinal in the 2012 Summer Paralympics where he lost to Jose Manuel Ruiz Reyes in three sets to two.

He was born with a birth defect in his left hand.

References

1982 births
Living people
People from Sátoraljaújhely
Sportspeople from Debrecen
Paralympic table tennis players of Hungary
Table tennis players at the 2000 Summer Paralympics
Table tennis players at the 2004 Summer Paralympics
Table tennis players at the 2008 Summer Paralympics
Table tennis players at the 2012 Summer Paralympics
Table tennis players at the 2016 Summer Paralympics
Hungarian male table tennis players